Jennifer Elaine Smith (Jenn Smith) is a behavioral ecologist and evolutionary biologist. She is an Assistant Professor of Biology at University of Wisconsin, Eau Claire. Previously, she was an Associate Professor and Chair of Biology at Mills College, in Oakland, California, prior to its merger with Northeastern University. Her research focuses primarily on the social lives of mammals based on insights gained from long-term studies on marked individuals and comparative approaches.

Early life and education 
Smith was born in the small coastal town of Cushing, Maine. She holds a B.A. in Biology with a concentration in Environmental Science from Colby College and an M.S. in Integrative Biology from University of Illinois at Urbana–Champaign. She went on to complete dual Ph.Ds. in Zoology and Ecology, Evolutionary Biology and Behavior at Michigan State University. Her dissertation research with Kay E. Holekamp involved extensive fieldwork in Kenya and focused on the evolutionary and ecological forces shaping patterns of cooperation among spotted hyenas
Before joining the faculty at Mills College, she was an American Association of University Women postdoctoral fellow with Daniel T. Blumstein at the Department of Ecology and Evolutionary Biology, as well as in the Institute for Society and Genetics, at the University of California, Los Angeles.

Work and academic contributions
Smith is known for her contributions to our understanding of sociality in free-living mammals. Among her most prominent contributions are those focused on animal social networks, comparative social evolution, the fission-fusion society of and coalition formation in spotted hyenas, leadership in mammalian societies, explaining large-scale patterns of collective animal behavior, intergroup conflict, and intragroup coalitions across mammalian societies. Since 2013, she has managed her own Long-term Study on the Behavioral Ecology of the California ground squirrel at Briones Regional Park.

References

External links 
 Smith Behavioral Ecology Lab

Evolutionary biologists
Ethologists
Living people
Colby College alumni
Michigan State University alumni
Year of birth missing (living people)
University of Illinois Urbana-Champaign alumni
University of California, Los Angeles faculty
University of Wisconsin–Eau Claire faculty
Mills College faculty